Rustica basiprocessus is a moth of the family Erebidae first described by Michael Fibiger in 2008. It is known from the mountains of central Sri Lanka.

The wingspan is about 12.5 mm. The forewing is long, narrow, dark brown and the reniform stigma is weakly marked. The costal patch in the upper medial area is well marked and blackish. The antemedial line is marked and blackish. The terminal line of the hindwing is weakly defined. There is a discal spot.

References

Micronoctuini
Moths described in 2008
Taxa named by Michael Fibiger